The 1956–57 season was Real Madrid Club de Fútbol's 54th season in existence and the club's 26th consecutive season in the top flight of Spanish football.

Summary
The Spanish Federation lifted the ban on foreign player transfers allowing chairman Santiago Bernabéu to buy French playmaker Raymond Kopa from Stade de Reims to boost the midfield as a winger, in fact the trade was released days before the 1956 European Cup Final against the same French squad. Due to the rule of limited foreigners Kopa could not feature until October, when Di Stefano became a Spanish citizen. The team finished the League campaign 5 points above Sevilla and FC Barcelona, clinching its fifth League title ever. Also, Alfredo Di Stéfano won the top scorer trophy with 31 goals.

Initially, due to the rule of not being a current league champion, the club would not compete in the continental tournament. However, chairman Santiago Bernabéu, also an organizer of the competition, allowed their entry as holders; the squad won its second consecutive European Cup in a close final against Italian team Fiorentina. In May, the club reached the quarter-finals of the Copa del Generalísimo where they were defeated 6–1 (8–3 on aggregate) by Barcelona. It would be the only trophy not conquered by the squad in the campaign. The team closed a superb season clinching its second Latin Cup, winning the final against Portuguese side Benfica.

Squad

Transfers

Competitions

La Liga

League table

Position by round

Matches

Copa del Generalísimo

Round of 16

Quarter-finals

European Cup

Round of 16

Quarter-finals

Semi-finals

Final

Latin Cup

Semi-finals

Final

Statistics

Squad statistics

Players statistics

References

Real Madrid CF seasons
Real Madrid CF
Spanish football championship-winning seasons
UEFA Champions League-winning seasons